Camden Toy is an American actor, screenwriter, and film editor. He is best known as a character actor, often under special effects prosthetic makeup. He has acted in over one hundred independent films, and a number of television roles.

Early life 
Toy grew up in Pennsylvania, and his interest in the film industry was encouraged early on by his father, who worked as an actor and makeup artist.

Career 
Toy was one of the founding members and artistic director of the Obie Award-winning Nada theatre in New York City.

After moving to Los Angeles, he appeared in the Buffy the Vampire Slayer episode "Hush" as one of the demonic Gentlemen. In season seven, he played the skin-eating demon Gnarl in "Same Time, Same Place", and had a recurring role of the "ubervamp" Turok-Han. He also played the Nosferatu-like vampire "The Prince of Lies" on the Angel episode "Why We Fight".

Toy was a series regular on the television sitcom Goodnight Burbank and in the first four seasons of the Emmy Award-winning series The Bay. Most recently, Toy appeared in an episode of Into the Dark.

Filmography

Film

Television

References

External links

Official site

American male film actors
American male television actors
Living people
Year of birth missing (living people)